The Little Rancheria River is a tributary of the Rancheria River having its origin in the northernmost Stikine Ranges of British Columbia, Canada, and joining its parent stream in the Yukon Territory.  The Rancheria is a tributary of the Liard and defines the northern limit of the Stikine Ranges and their parent range, the Cassiar Mountains.  The river crosses the provincial-territorial boundary at 129° 48' 00" W.

See also
List of rivers of British Columbia
List of rivers of Yukon

References
Canada GeoNames Database entry (YT)
Canada GeoNames Database entry (BC)

Rivers of Yukon
Rivers of British Columbia
Cassiar Land District